Kotyza (Czech feminine: Kotyzová) is a surname. Notable people include:

 Carlie Kotyza-Witthuhn (born 1986/87), American politician
 David Kotyza (born 1967), Czech tennis coach
 Martin Kotyza (born 1984), Czech footballer

See also
 

Czech-language surnames